Gurkhan was a Mongol title meaning "Universal Ruler" and roughly equivalent to the older term khagan. It was held by the rulers of the Western Liao dynasty in the 13th century. The title was first adopted by Yelü Dashi (Emperor Dezong of Western Liao) in 1132. It comes from the Middle Mongol word "Gür" or "Kür", meaning "wide" or "general". Christopher I. Beckwith claims that the title has the meaning "the ruler of the earth" in his book Empires of Silk Road.

Notes

References
 Biran, Michal, The Empire of the Qara Khitai in Eurasian history, Cambridge University Press, 2005.

See also
 Beg
 Khan (title)
 Mirza

Royal titles
Chinese royal titles
Qara Khitai